Fort McMurray-Wood Buffalo is a provincial electoral district in Alberta, Canada. The district is one of 87 districts mandated to return a single member (MLA) to the Legislative Assembly of Alberta using the first past the post method of voting.

The district had in recent years been favourable to the election of Progressive Conservative candidates, a trend broken when Tany Yao won it for the Wildrose. Yao joined the United Conservative Party when the Wildrose merged with the PCs.

Geography
Fort McMurray-Wood Buffalo is a largely rural riding in the northeast corner of Alberta. Municipally, the riding consists of the northern part of the Regional Municipality of Wood Buffalo and almost all of Improvement District No. 24. The riding is home to the bulk of industrial activity relating to the Athabasca oil sands.

The major urban centre in the region, Fort McMurray, is split between this riding and Fort McMurray-Lac La Biche, with the northern neighbourhood of Timberlea falling within the boundaries of Fort McMurray-Wood Buffalo. Other communities in the riding include the hamlets of Fort Chipewyan, Fort Fitzgerald, and Fort McKay.

Three First Nation band governments are based in Fort McMurray-Wood Buffalo: Athabasca Chipewyan First Nation, Fort McKay First Nation, and Mikisew Cree First Nation. Smith's Landing First Nation is based outside of the riding but has several reserves within its boundaries. All of these bands are signatories of Treaty 8.

In addition to Fort McMurray-Lac La Biche to the south, Fort McMurray-Wood Buffalo also borders the riding of Lesser Slave Lake to the southwest, the riding of Peace River to the west, the Northwest Territories to the north, and the province of Saskatchewan to the east.

History
The electoral district was created in the 2004 electoral boundary re-distribution by merging the electoral district of Fort McMurray with a portion of Athabasca-Wabasca residing in the Municipal district of Wood Buffalo.

The decade that went by since the district was created saw significant population growth due to exploration and development of the oil sands. The 2010 electoral boundary re-distribution resulted in the splitting of the district in two along north south lines creating Fort McMurray-Conklin in the eastern half.

Boundary history

Representation history

The electoral district was created in the 2003 boundary redistribution. The first election held that year saw Fort McMurray incumbent Progressive Conservative MLA Guy Boutilier win the new seat with a landslide over four other candidates to pick it up for his party.

Boutilier was appointed as Minister of Environment by Premier Ralph Klein in 2004. In 2006 he was shuffled to Minister of International Relations. He ran for a second term as a cabinet minister in the 2008 general election. That election saw him win another big majority.

On July 18, 2009 Boutilier was ejected from caucus by Premier Ed Stelmach after speaking out against the government over a broken promise to put a seniors care facility in Fort McMurray. He sat as an Independent until joining the Wildrose Alliance caucus as an Independent member on June 24, 2010. On October 25, 2010 he became a full member of the caucus.

However, Boutilier was defeated in 2012 by PC Mike Allen. Allen was also ejected from PC caucus in 2013 after being caught in a prostitution sting while on an official trip to Minnesota, but was readmitted to caucus in 2014.

In the 2015 election, Allen was defeated by Wildrose candidate Tany Yao. When the Wildrose and PC parties merged in 2017, Yao joined the new United Conservative Party along with the rest of the Wildrose caucus.

Yao running as a member of the United Conservative Party would once again defeat NDP candidate Stephen Drover in the 2019 general election by a healthy margin of 7,140 votes.

Legislature results

2004 general election

2008 general election

2012 general election

2015 general election

2019 general election

Senate nominee results

2004 Senate nominee election district results
Voters had the option of selecting 4 Candidates on the Ballot

2012 Senate nominee election district results

Student Vote results

2004 election

On November 19, 2004 a Student Vote was conducted at participating Alberta schools to parallel the 2004 Alberta general election results. The vote was designed to educate students and simulate the electoral process for persons who have not yet reached the legal majority. The vote was conducted in 80 of the 83 provincial electoral districts with students voting for actual election candidates. Schools with a large student body that reside in another electoral district had the option to vote for candidates outside of the electoral district then where they were physically located.

2012 election

See also
List of Alberta provincial electoral districts

References

External links
Elections Alberta
The Legislative Assembly of Alberta
Demographics for Fort McMurray-Wood Buffalo

Alberta provincial electoral districts
Fort McMurray